Pho Mak Khaeng is a tambon (sub-district) of Bueng Khong Long District, in Bueng Kan Province, Thailand. In 2015 it had a population of 12,783 people.

Administration

Central administration
The tambon is divided into 16 administrative villages (mubans).

Local administration
Governance of the sub-district is shared by two local governments:
 Subdistrict municipality (thesaban tambon) Bueng Khong Long (เทศบาลตำบลบึงโขงหลง)
 subdistrict administrative organization (SAO) Pho Mak Khaeng (องค์การบริหารส่วนตำบลโพธิ์หมากแข้ง)

References

External links
Thaitambon.com on Pho Mak Khaeng

Tambon of Bueng Kan province
Populated places in Bueng Kan province
Bueng Khong Long District